Monte Tagliaferro is a mountain of the Pennine Alps. It is one of the most popular hiking destination of Valsesia.

Etymology 
The name, which literally means iron cutting, may come from a sharp stone block located not far away from the top.

Geography 
The mountain is located in Valsesia (VC, Piemonte region). Administratively it is divided between the comunes of  Alagna Valsesia and Alto Sermenza.

SOIUSA classification 
According to the SOIUSA (International Standardized Mountain Subdivision of the Alps) the mountain can be classified in the following way:
 main part = Western Alps
 major sector = North Western Alps
 section = Pennine Alps
 subsection = Eastern Aosta and Northern  Valsesia Alps
 supergroup = Contrafforti valsesiani del Monte Rosa
 group = Costiera Punta Grober-Tagliaferro-Montevecchio
 subgroup = Costiera del Tagliaferro
 sector of subgroup = Contrafforte Piglimò-Tagliaferro
 code = I/B-9.III-C.7.b/a

Access to the summit

The easiest route for the summit starts from Rima San Giuseppe and  reaches the summit passing through Vallarolo pass (2,332  m).
Nearby the mountain, at 2,264  m, is located Rifugio Ferioli, a public mountain hut.

Maps
 Italian official cartography (Istituto Geografico Militare - IGM); on-line version: www.pcn.minambiente.it
 Istituto Geografico Centrale - Carta dei sentieri e dei rifugi scala 1:50.000 n. 10 Monte Rosa, Alagna e Macugnaga

Notes

Tagliaferro
Tagliaferro
Tagliaferro
Pennine Alps
Valsesia